Miss Match (Marathi: मिस मॅच ) is a 2014 Marathi romantic drama film directed by Girish Vasaikar. The film is about the journey of Priya and her search for her perfect match. It has been acclaimed by Marathi audience as Karan Johar Movie. Critical reception was positive.

Plot

Miss Match is a story of a girl named Priya (Mrinmai Kolwalkar) and her search for her perfect match. Priya is the only daughter of a U.S based N.R.I businessman Suryakant Samarth (Uday Tikekar). Like every father Suryakant Samarth wants his daughter to get married. But Priya doesn't believe in arranged marriages and asks her father to give her a time of 2 years in which she will find a perfect match for herself, she also convinces him to send her to Pune for her post graduation course.

Her father agrees but puts a condition that if she fails to do so in the given time she will have to marry a person of his choice.

One and half years is already over and Priya has not found her match yet but Priya has still not given up hope.

Mira who is Priya's cousin, college mate & confidante suggests her to imagine and visualise the man she is longing for and assures her of finding the man of her dream by doing so. Priya follows that and suddenly declares to her friends of having a boyfriend. She describes in detail her imaginary boyfriend his name, looks, job etc. Her friends are shocked by this impromptu boyfriend theory. But to Priya's surprise a man called Raj (Bhushan Pradhan) enters her life and his profile matches completely to the imaginary profile created by her. Priya confronts Raj and asks him to reveal his identity to her, he denies but at the same time takes efforts to win her confidence and create a place for himself in Priya's life.

Priya's situation gets more complicated since Raj keeps his identity concealed but continues to pursue her and on the other hand the given time is running out and her father is lining up marriage proposals for her.

The pressure, confusion and dilemma is built up in Priya's life.

Does Priya find a solution, does she go ahead to find out the truth of Raj or does she give up on her dreams and settle for her father's choice? All the queries, confusion and the struggle to find a girls perfect match is beautifully concluded in the film Miss Match.

Reception
Miss Match was released in Maharashtra and  Karnataka. The film has received highly positive reviews.

Cast
 Bhushan Pradhan as Raj
 Mrinmayee Kolwalkar as Priya
 Uday Tikekar as Priya's Father
 Bhalchandra Kadam as Bhau
 Ashutosh Kulkarni as Amit
 Sandeep Deshpande as Raj's Father
 Mugdha Shah as Raj's Mother
 Ananya as Meera
 Sayali Deodhar as Ashwini
 Gayatri Deshmukh as Shweta
 Jaiwant Bhalekar as Ranga The Mechanic
 Raseek Raj as Omkar
 Vishal Kulthe as Rohit
 Om Jangam as Amar
 Tony as Goon

Soundtrack

The soundtrack was composed entirely by Neeraj, who is professionally a doctor. The lyrics were written by Ashish Panat who is also a doctor. The music album was released on 12 November 2014 alongside a theatrical trailer.

References

 Theatrical Trailer
  Book My Show
 Blockbuster
  Bollywood Trade
  Zee Talkies
  Times of India

External links
 
 

2014 films
2010s Marathi-language films